Southside, Arkansas may refer to:
Southside, Independence County, Arkansas, a city in Independence County
Southside, Van Buren County, Arkansas, an unincorporated community in Van Buren County